Serenadium is the first studio album by Danish death metal band Iniquity released in 1996.

Track listing
 "Tranquil Seizure" - 6:20 
 "Prophecy of the Dying Watcher" - 4:26 
 "Serenadium" - 4:42 
 "Spectral Scent" - 6:25
 "Mockery Retained to Obturate" - 4:28
 "Encysted and Dormant" - 5:48 
 "Son of Cosmos" - 3:38 
 "Retorn" - 5:35

Credits
Thomas Christensen - Bass
Lars Friis - Guitar
Brian Petrowsky - vocals, Guitar
Jacob Olsen - drums
Jan Borsing - Producer, Engineer, Mixing

Jacob Olsen did the drums on this CD, and then quit the band. Jesper Frost joined just before it was released and that is why his picture is in the booklet.

1996 debut albums
Iniquity (band) albums